The Collegiate Church of Our Lady is a 13th-century Gothic cathedral in Dinant, a city in Waloon Belgium, on the banks of the River Meuse. The collegiate church replaced a 10th-century Romanesque church which collapsed in 1228, leaving only the North door. Its most iconic part is the separate 16th century pear-shaped bell tower.

Gallery

References

External links 

 The Collegiate Church of Our Lady on TripAdvisor
 The Collegiate Church of Our Lady on Michelin Guides

Gothic architecture in Belgium
Roman Catholic cathedrals in Belgium
Churches in Namur (province)
Dinant